Lars Vegard (3 February 1880 – 21 December 1963) was a Norwegian physicist who is a pioneer in crystallography. He also made contributions to materials science and the science of aurora borealis. The Vegard's law in solid state chemistry and materials science, the only law of nature formulated by a Norwegian, is named after him.

Education and scientific career
He was born in Vegårshei as a son of farmer Nils Gundersen Grasaasen (1840–1886) and Anne Grundesdatter Espeland (1839–1930). He attended middle school in Risør and took the examen artium in Kristiania in 1899. He enrolled at the Royal Frederick University (now University of Oslo) and graduated with the cand.real. degree in 1905.

From 1906, Vegard worked as an assistant under Kristian Birkeland. He studied under J. J. Thomson from 1908 to 1910 and under Wilhelm Wien from 1911 to 1912. He was a research fellow in physics from 1908 to 1910 and amanuensis from 1910 to 1913, both at the Royal Frederick University. In 1912 he published “Über die Lichterzeugung in Glimmlicht und Kanalstrahlen” in Annalen der Physik, and this earned him the dr.philos. degree in 1913. He continued advancing at the University, and worked as a docent from 1913 to 1918 and professor from 1918 to 1952. He was also the dean of the Faculty of Mathematics and Natural Sciences from 1937 to 1941.

In 1939, Vegard proved hydrogen emissions in aurora borealis, and in 1948 he pointed out the doppler effect in hydrogen lines of aurora borealis. He penned about 100 academic publications, and was a board chairman of Det norske institutt for kosmisk fysikk from 1928 to 1935 and 1939 to 1955.

Honors and awards 
He was a member of the Norwegian Academy of Science and Letters from 1914, vice president of the International Union of Physics from 1932 to 1940, and a Commander of the Royal Norwegian Order of St. Olav.

Political career 
Vegard also had a political career, representing the Liberal Party in Aker municipal council from 1938 to 1945. He was married to consul's daughter Inger Hervora Petersen (1886–1961) from November 1915. He died in December 1963 in Oslo.

See also 
Vegard's law

References 

1880 births
1963 deaths
People from Vegårshei
University of Oslo alumni
Academic staff of the University of Oslo
Norwegian expatriates in the United Kingdom
Norwegian expatriates in Germany
Norwegian physicists
Members of the Norwegian Academy of Science and Letters
Politicians from Aker
Liberal Party (Norway) politicians